Demolition by neglect refers to the practice of allowing a building to deteriorate to the point that demolition becomes necessary or restoration becomes unreasonable. The practice has been used by property owners as a means of sidestepping historic preservation laws by providing justification for the demolition of historical buildings. In order to prevent demolition by neglect, a number of cities have adopted ordinances requiring property owners to properly maintain historical buildings.

References 

Historic preservation